WMBZ (92.5 FM "Buzz Country 92.5") is a country music-formatted radio station in West Bend, Wisconsin. It serves the greater Milwaukee area, mainly the city's northern suburbs. WMBZ is owned by Wisconsin-based David Magnum, through licensee Magnum Communications, Inc., along with sister WIBD and Racine-based WRJN and WVTY.  Its studios are in West Bend and the transmitter site is in Addison.

History
The station was originally WBKV-FM, an easy listening station. It was later known as "V92" and featured an automated adult contemporary and country format. On September 16, 1988, the station picked up the WBWI-FM call letters. WBWI-FM flipped to its current country format in late 1989/early 1990. For a few years it was known as "92 Country Rock" then "92 Country" before it was renamed to "Pure Country", a name they kept until 2004, when the station rebranded to simply "92.5 WBWI."

On June 25, 2014, Bliss Communications announced that it would sell WBWI-FM and WBKV, along with WRJN and WVTY (then WEZY) in Racine, to David Magnum's Magnum Communications, Inc. Bliss had owned WBWI and WBKV since 1970 (when WBWI was still WBKV-FM). The sale, at a price of $2.25 million, was consummated on October 31, 2014.

On February 9, 2015, WBWI-FM rebranded as "Buzz Country". On February 18, 2015, WBWI-FM changed their call letters to WMBZ.

Previous logo

References

External links
WMBZ Website

MBZ
Radio stations established in 1958
1958 establishments in Wisconsin
Country radio stations in the United States